Kippure at , is the 56th-highest peak in Ireland on the Arderin scale, and the 72nd-highest peak on the Vandeleur-Lynam scale.  Kippure is situated in the far northern sector of the Wicklow Mountains, where it lies on the border of the counties of Dublin and Wicklow in Ireland.  Kippure is the County Top for Dublin, and its height and positioning over Dublin city have made its summit an important site for transmission masts, which are highly visible from a distance.  Kippure's slopes feed into the Liffey Head Bog which forms the source of the River Liffey.  The summit can be easily accessed from the east via a path that lies off the R115 (also called the "Military Road") road along the route to the Sally Gap.

Naming
According to Irish academic Paul Tempan, "Kippure" is simply a "transliteration of a pronunciation collected locally, but without any clear meaning". Tempan notes that it resembles the Irish language term "ciop" (meaning stump) and "iúr" (meaning yew), however "stump of the yew" would be "Ciop Iúir".  While it is unlikely that yew trees could have ever grown on an exposed mountain such as Kippure, Tempan notes that there is a connection with a similar name in the lower valley, where the association with yew trees could have come.

Geography

Kippure's large massif sits at the head of two major valleys: the valley of Glencree (part of Wicklow) to the east, which it forms with Tonduff , Maulin , and Prince William's Seat ; and the valley of Glenasmole (part of Dublin) to the north, which is forms with Seefingan , and Corrig Mountain .  

Kippure has two corrie lakes on its north-east flank, Lough Bray Upper and Lough Bray Lower.  The slopes of Kippure hold the sources of several rivers, including tributaries that feed the River Liffey from the Liffey Head Bog on the western slopes of Tonduff, and tributaries that feed the River Dodder.

Kippure's prominence of  qualifies it as a Marilyn, and it also ranks it as the 32nd-highest mountain in Ireland on the MountainViews Online Database, 100 Highest Irish Mountains, where the minimum prominence threshold is 100 metres (328'). 

On very clear days, Kippure can be seen from Wales.

Transmission site

At the summit of Kippure stands a 127m (417') television and radio transmitter mast. This is the oldest television transmission site in the Republic of Ireland and was initially selected as a potential VHF FM radio transmitter site during the course of a Radio Éireann survey in the mid-1950s. The Irish Board of Works built an access road to the site in 1959, and the transmitter installation work was then started by the British company Pye Ltd. By the summer of 1961 the mast was erected and test transmissions followed, consisting of slide views of Ireland, a test-card, and the music of Count John McCormack.

Telefís Éireann began with transmission from Kippure on 31 December 1961 using the British 405-line TV standard on VHF Band III channel 7, to be followed by a 625-line service on channel H in the summer of 1962. Kippure was the first of the original five main Telefís Éireann transmitters to come into service, the others being, Truskmore (1962), Mount Leinster (1963), Maghera (1963), and Mullaghanish (1963).

VHF FM transmission of RTÉ Radio (the former Radio Éireann) commenced in 1966, with stereo broadcasting beginning in 1969.

405-line transmission from Kippure ceased in 1978 with the arrival of RTÉ 2, however, Kippure did not transmit RTÉ 2 until much later. Initially on Channel J at low power later moving to Channel H with RTÉ 1 moving to Channel E.

Kippure's importance in radio and television transmission has diminished since the late 1970s with the opening of three new UHF transmitter sites at Three Rock in County Dún Laoghaire–Rathdown, Clermont Carn in County Louth, and Cairn Hill in County Longford, which provide better reception in most areas previously served only by Kippure. Today the Irish DTT service, Saorview, the national FM radio stations, and some commercial radio stations are broadcast from the site.

Current transmissions

Terrestrial television

Digital Radio (closed 2021)

Analogue FM radio

Kippure TV relay transmitter

Bibliography

Gallery

See also

Wicklow Way
Wicklow Round
Wicklow Mountains
Lists of mountains in Ireland
List of mountains of the British Isles by height
List of tallest structures in Ireland
List of Marilyns in the British Isles
List of Hewitt mountains in England, Wales and Ireland

References

External links
MountainViews: The Irish Mountain Website, Kippure
MountainViews: Irish Online Mountain Database
The Database of British and Irish Hills , the largest database of British Isles mountains ("DoBIH")
Hill Bagging UK & Ireland, the searchable interface for the DoBIH

Marilyns of Ireland
Mountains and hills of County Wicklow
Hewitts of Ireland
Mountains under 1000 metres
Mountains and hills of South Dublin (county)
Highest points of Irish counties
Transmitter sites in Ireland